Cañas is a corregimiento in Tonosí District, Los Santos Province, Panama with a population of 650 as of 2010. Its population as of 1990 was 1,015; its population as of 2000 was 994.

References

Corregimientos of Los Santos Province